Halver is a town in Germany.

History
Around 950 the Oberhof Halvara was first mentioned in the Werdener Probsteiregister. For more than 500 years Halver was the seat of a Fehmic court, the earliest definite evidence of which is in 1243; it ceased to exist in 1753. This court was most famous because of the trial of duke Henry XVI the Rich of Bavaria-Landshut and the knight of Toerring on May 2, 1430.

With effect from October 1, 1912 the municipality Halver was split, Schalksmühle becoming an independent municipality. Both were administered together in the Amt Halver. As part of the communal reforms of the district of Altena the Amt was dissolved on January 1, 1969, and Halver was granted city rights.

Coat of arms
The red and white checked base refers to the fess from the arms of the Counts of the Mark. The stone judgement table under a linden tree represents the Feme court. It was designed by Otto Hupp, and was granted on March 29, 1935.

The Amt Halver had a separate coat of arms, which was also designed by Otto Hupp. It combined elements from the two member municipalities Halver and Schalksmühle: in the upper part is a linden branch symbolizing Halver, in the bottom the upper half of a black mill wheel as the symbol of Schalksmühle. Separating the two is the red and white checked fess, as above. The coat of arms was granted on June 8, 1936, and expired with the dissolving of the Amt in 1969.

Number of inhabitants

Municipality Halver
 1915: 6.476
 1925: 7.729
 1935: 8.122
 1939: 8.772
 1946: 12.045
 1961: 13.684
 1968: 15.713

Town Halver
 1969: 16.254
 1978: 16.176
 1988: 15.399
 1995: 16.983
 1999: 17.876
 2003: 18.111
 2006: 17.776
 2008: 17.465
 2010: 17.159
 2012: 16.300
 2014: 16.677

Mayor
At the election in 2015, Michael Brosch (SPD) became the new mayor in Halver, he won against his predecessor Dr. Bernd Eicker.

International relations

The town twinning with the Swedish city Katrineholm originated from the connection between a music group from Halver and a traditional dancing group from Katrineholm. It was officially signed on September 30, 1963.

On April 25, 1975 the twinning agreement with the French city Hautmont was signed. There has also been a city friendship with Pardess-Hanna in Israel since 1989.

Sons and daughters of the town

 Eugen Schmalenbach (1873-1955), economist, the local commercial vocational school was named after him

References

External links

http://www.halver.de

Märkischer Kreis